Pigeon Grove Township is one of twenty-six townships in Iroquois County, Illinois, USA.  As of the 2010 census, its population was 1,155 and it contained 570 housing units.  Pigeon Grove Township was formed from portions of Loda Township and Fountain Creek in September 1875.

Geography

Cities, towns, villages
 Cissna Park

Major highways
  Illinois Route 49

Demographics

School districts
 Cissna Park Community Unit School District 6
 Hoopeston Area Community Unit School District 11
 Paxton-Buckley-Loda Community Unit School District 10

Political districts
 Illinois' 15th congressional district
 State House District 105
 State Senate District 53

References
 
 United States Census Bureau 2007 TIGER/Line Shapefiles
 United States National Atlas

External links
 City-Data.com
 Illinois State Archives

Townships in Iroquois County, Illinois
Townships in Illinois
1875 establishments in Illinois
Populated places established in 1875